Lure of the Swamp is a 1957 American drama film directed by Hubert Cornfield and written by William George, based on the 1953 novel of the same name by Gil Brewer. The film stars Marshall Thompson, Willard Parker, Joan Vohs, Jack Elam, Leo Gordon and Joan Lora. The film was released in May 1957 by 20th Century-Fox.

Plot

Cast 
Marshall Thompson as Simon Lewt
Willard Parker as James Lister
Joan Vohs as Cora Payne
Jack Elam as Henry Bliss
Leo Gordon as Steggins- Insurance Investigator
Joan Lora as Evie Dee
James Maloney as August Dee
Myron Healy as Bank Guard

References

External links 
 

Lure of the Swamp at BFI

1957 drama films
1957 films
20th Century Fox films
CinemaScope films
American drama films
Films directed by Hubert Cornfield
Films scored by Paul Dunlap
1950s English-language films
1950s American films